Pawandeep Singh (born 5 July 1992) is an Indian cricketer. He made his Twenty20 debut for Chhattisgarh in the 2018–19 Syed Mushtaq Ali Trophy on 2 March 2019.

References

External links
 

1992 births
Living people
Indian cricketers
Chhattisgarh cricketers
Place of birth missing (living people)